"Ocean Man" is a song by American rock band Ween, the thirteenth track on their sixth studio album, The Mollusk (1997). It was released as a promotional CD single through Elektra Records in 1997. It was also released as the B-side to the earlier single "Mutilated Lips" on June 24, 1997. It is one of Ween's best-known songs, and has appeared on various film soundtracks and commercials since its release, most notably with The SpongeBob SquarePants Movie in 2004. The song has been performed live at various occasions, most notably Live in Chicago and Live at Stubb's.

Composition
"Ocean Man" was recorded at a beach house in Jersey Shore during the off-season, which Gene and Dean Ween had rented for the recording sessions of The Mollusk. The first song recorded for the album was "Cold Blows the Wind", whose theme influenced the initial two weeks of recording. "The Mollusk," "Mutilated Lips," "The Golden Eel," "She Wanted to Leave," and "Ocean Man," were all recorded during these first two weeks. "Aaron [Gene Ween] had a mandolin, he was always playing it," Dean Ween wrote in a retrospective of the album in 2017, "and we discounted it. [...] when we wrote the lyrics, it was just magic, man. Everything just fell into place."

According to "Sheet Music Boss", Ocean Man is composed in the key of E major. However, according to Tunebat, when played live the song is transposed to the key of G major and is set in the time signature of common time with a tempo of 123 beats per minute.

Track listing
 Elektra — PRCD-9858-2 — Promotional CD single

Reception
AllMusic referred to this song as an example of how Ween's "array of silly jokes and musical parody is richer and more diverse than most of its alternative rock contemporaries".

In popular culture

"Ocean Man" was most famously used as the end credits song for The SpongeBob SquarePants Movie (2004). In late 2015 and early 2016, "Ocean Man" became an Internet meme. During this time, the song began appearing in remix videos on video sharing platforms such as YouTube and Vine. Becoming a meme also helped the band gain more listeners, with "Ocean Man" being their most listened to song on Spotify and Apple Music.

References

External links
 
 
 

1997 songs
1997 singles
Ween songs
Songs written by Gene Ween
Songs written by Dean Ween
SpongeBob SquarePants (film series)
Elektra Records singles
Internet memes introduced in 2015
Songs about oceans and seas